Longombas are a duo from Kenya performing a mixture of Hip hop and Soukous. Christian Longomba died on March 3, 2021.

Career 

The group consists of two brothers, Christian and Lovy Longomba. They're from a musical family; father Lovy Longomba was a member of Super Mazembe, while their grandfather Vicky Longomba was a member of TPOK Jazz. France-based Congolese musician Awilo Longomba is their uncle. 

The group entered Kenyan music scene in 2002 with their song "Dondosa", which became a national hit. Follow-up singles were "Piga Makofi", "Shika More" and "Vuta Pumz". Their debut album Chukua was released in 2005 by Ogopa DJs. In 2003 they had left Ogopa DJs record label together with Deux Vultures and Mr. Googz & Vinnie Banton, and formed their own label, Bad Man Camp. Deux Vultures and Longombas, however, later returned to Ogopa 

They performed at the 2006 Channel O Music Video Awards in South Africa. The group later relocated from Kenya to Los Angeles.

Awards 
2005 Kora Awards Africa - Best East African Group 
2006 Kisima Music Awards - Best Group from Kenya & Boomba Group & Best Song from Kenya ("Vuta Pumz") & Social Responsibility
2006 Tanzania Music Awards - Best East African Album (Chukua)

Nominations 
2006 Pearl of Africa Music Awards - Best Group from Kenya

References

External links 
Longombas MySpace profile

Kenyan musical groups
2002 establishments in Kenya